Outer loop can refer to:

The counterclockwise lanes of travel on an orbital roadway for traffic that drives on the right, or the clockwise lanes of travel for traffic that drives on the left.
The outer loop (counter-clockwise roadway) of Interstate 495 (Capital Beltway)
A beltway that encircles an urban area's "outer" limits or the outermost beltway.
The proposed Outer Perimeter around Atlanta, Georgia
New York State Route 47, the former designation of the Outer Loop expressway around Rochester, New York
Interstate 295 (North Carolina), also known as the Fayetteville Outer Loop
Interstate 540 and North Carolina Highway 540, also known as the Raleigh Outer Loop
Osaka Outer Loop Line, a tentative name of Osaka Higashi Line, a railway line around Osaka, Japan
In computer programming, a control flow loop that has another loop nested inside it—see Inner loop